Richard Baldus (11 May 1885, in Salonika – 28 January 1945, in Munich) was a German mathematician, specializing in geometry.

Richard Baldus was the son of a station chief of the Anatolian Railway. After his graduation (Abitur) in 1904 at Wilhelmsgymnasium München, he studied in Munich and at the University of Erlangen, where he received his Ph.D. (Promotierung) in 1910 under Max Noether with thesis Über Strahlensysteme, welche unendlich viele Regelflächen 2. Grades enthalten and where he received his Habilitierung in 1911. He became in 1919 Professor für Geometrie at the Technische Hochschule Karlsruhe and served there as rector in 1923–1924. In 1932 he became Professor für Geometrie (as successor to Sebastian Finsterwalder) at TU München, where in 1934 he also became the successor to the professorial chair of Walther von Dyck, upon the latter's retirement.

In 1933 Baldus was the president of the Deutsche Mathematiker-Vereinigung. He was an invited speaker at the International Congress of Mathematicians in 1928 at Bologna. He was elected in 1929 a member of the Heidelberger Akademie der Wissenschaften and in 1935 a member of the Bayerische Akademie der Wissenschaften.

Selected publications

References

External links
 

1885 births
1945 deaths
20th-century German mathematicians
Geometers
University of Erlangen-Nuremberg alumni
Academic staff of the Karlsruhe Institute of Technology
Academic staff of the Technical University of Munich
Heads of universities in Germany
German expatriates in the Ottoman Empire